Michael Lynne (April 23, 1941 – March 24, 2019) was an American film executive.

Biography
Michael Lynne graduated from Brooklyn College (1961) and held a Juris Doctor from Columbia University. After a chance encounter with law-school acquaintance Bob Shaye, Lynne joined New Line Cinema as outside legal counsel in the early 1980s. In 1990, he was appointed president and chief operating officer of the studio. In 2001, he was named co-chairman and co-chief executive officer.

Lynne started to collect wine and bought two vineyards on Long Island in 1999 and 2000.

In June 2008, after New Line had been fully merged into Warner Bros. Shaye and Lynne departed New Line and formed an independent film company, Unique Features. He died of cancer on March 24, 2019, aged 77.

References

External links

1941 births
2019 deaths
Film producers from New York (state)
Brooklyn College alumni
Place of death missing
People from Brooklyn
Columbia Law School alumni
American film studio executives
Midwood High School alumni
20th-century American businesspeople
20th-century American lawyers